Jaberi may refer to:
 Jaberi, Bushehr
 Jaberi, Kermanshah
 Jaberi, Khuzestan